26th U-boat Flotilla ("26. Unterseebootsflottille") was a training flotilla ("Ausbildungsflottille ") of Nazi Germany's Kriegsmarine during World War II.

The flotilla was formed at Pillau in April 1941 under the command of Korvettenkapitän Hans-Gerrit von Stockhausen. The flotilla trained newly commissioned U-boats in the firing of torpedoes (Torpedoschiessausbildung), a course which lasted for three to four weeks. In 1945, as the Russians advanced deeper into Eastern Europe, the flotilla relocated to Warnemünde. The flotilla was disbanded in May 1945 when Germany surrendered.

Flotilla commanders
 Korvettenkapitän Hans-Gerrit von Stockhausen (April 1941–January 1943) 
 Korvettenkapitän Karl-Friedrich Merten (January–April 1943) 
 Fregattenkapitan Helmut Brümmer-Patzig (April 1943–March 1945) 
 Korvettenkapitän Ernst Bauer (April–May 1945)

Assigned U-boats
Seven U-boats were assigned to this flotilla during its service.

References

26
Military units and formations established in 1941
Military units and formations disestablished in 1945